Marek Červenka (born 5 February 1991) is a Czech footballer who currently plays as a forward for Pardubice on loan from Dukla Prague.

Career
On 25 January 2019, Červenka joined NIFL Premiership side Linfield on loan from Teplice until the end of the season.

Personal life
Marek's older brother Roman (born 1985) is a professional ice hockey player.

References

External links
 

1991 births
Living people
Czech footballers
Czech expatriate footballers
Czech First League players
Czech National Football League players
NIFL Premiership players
SK Slavia Prague players
FC Sellier & Bellot Vlašim players
FK Viktoria Žižkov players
FK Baník Sokolov players
FC Baník Ostrava players
FK Teplice players
Linfield F.C. players
Footballers from Prague
Association football forwards
Czech expatriate sportspeople in Northern Ireland
Expatriate association footballers in Northern Ireland
FK Dukla Prague players
FK Pardubice players